The 1972 Isle of Man TT motorcycle races were held between 5–9 June 1972. It was the fifth round of the FIM Motorcycle Grand Prix World Championship (now MotoGP).

A fatal accident this year led, some years later, to the end of the Isle of Man TT as a FIM championship race. The Ultra-Lightweight race was held on the last day of the event in heavy rain, and Gilberto Parlotti crashed fatally at the Verandah section of the circuit 29 miles into his second lap; the Italian rider was 31 years old. After the death of Parlotti, his friend, Giacomo Agostini, an Italian MV Agusta rider, 9-time TT winner and a ten time 350cc and 500cc world champion, announced that he would never return to the Isle of Man to race. He considered the course too dangerous for international competition. As the years went on more top riders joined Agostini's boycott and in 1976 it was announced that the TT would be removed from the championship calendar. The British round of the FIM championship was held at Silverstone Circuit on the mainland from 1977 onwards.

In the last race of the 1972 event, Agostini won his 10th TT - the most for a non-British rider.

1972 Isle of Man Junior TT 350cc final standings
Monday 5 June 1972 – 5 Laps (188.65 Miles) Mountain Course.

1972 Isle of Man Sidecar 500cc TT final standings
Monday 5 June 1972 – 3 Laps (113.00 Miles) Mountain Course.

1972 Isle of Man Lightweight TT 250cc final standings
Wednesday 7 June 1972 – 4 Laps (150.92 Miles) Mountain Course.

1972 Isle of Man Ultra-Lightweight TT 125cc final standings
Friday 9 June 1972 – 3 Laps (113.00 Miles) Mountain Course.

1972 Isle of Man Senior TT 500cc final standings
Friday 9 June 1972 – 6 Laps (236.38 Miles) Mountain Course.

Non-championship races

1972 Isle of Man Production 750 cc TT final standings
Saturday 3 June 1972 – 4 Laps (150.92 Miles) Mountain Course.

1972 Isle of Man Production 500 cc TT final standings
Saturday 3 June 1972 – 4 Laps (150.92 Miles) Mountain Course.

1972 Isle of Man Production 250 cc TT final standings
Saturday 3 June 1972 – 4 Laps (150.92 Miles) Mountain Course.

1972 Isle of Man Sidecar 750cc TT final standings
Saturday 3 June 1972 – 3 Laps (113.00 Miles) Mountain Course.

1972 Isle of Man Formula 750 cc TT final standings
Monday 5 June 1972 – 5 Laps (188.65 Miles) Mountain Course.

Sources

External links
 Detailed race results

Isle of Man Tt
Tourist Trophy
Isle of Man TT
Isle of Man TT